Blomberg's toad (Rhaebo blombergi), also known as the Colombian giant toad, is a very large species of toad in the family Bufonidae. It has been recorded in Florida in 1963, apparently because of pet escape or release, but did not get established.

Etymology
This species epithet commemorates Swedish explorer Rolf Blomberg who collected the type series.

Description
Rhaebo blombergi is one of the world's largest toads: males measure  and females  in snout–to–vent length.

Life history
Captive individuals have an average lifespan of ten years, with the maximum reported age of 28 years.

Habitat and conservation
Rhaebo blombergi inhabit closed lowland tropical rainforest. They breed in pools, both temporary and permanent. It is locally common but considered near threatened by the International Union for Conservation of Nature (IUCN) because of habitat loss and pollution. It is also collected for pet trade.

References

blombergi
Amphibians of Colombia
Amphibians of Ecuador
Amphibians described in 1951
Taxa named by George S. Myers
Taxonomy articles created by Polbot